Professor Dr. Anantha Duraiappah has served as the inaugural director of the Mahatma Gandhi Institute of Education for Peace and Sustainable Development (MGIEP), a UNESCO Category 1 Research Institute in the Asia Pacific since 2014. He is also currently Visiting Professor in the Urban Institute at the Kyushu University, Japan, former visiting Professor, University of Tokyo, Japan, a fellow and member, World Academy of Arts and Sciences and a member of the Advisory Board, Journal - Indian Society of Ecological Economics. He has previously worked in senior positions at the United Nations University, United Nations Environment Progamme, International Institute for Sustainable Development and was previously an academic at Vrije Universiteit, National University of Singapore and European University Institute.

Education 
Duraiappah obtained his Bachelor of Science in Electronics University of Kent, England, in 1980, MBA in Finance, University of San Francisco America in 1983 and Ph.D. in Economics, University of Texas, Austin, America in 1991

Career 
Duraiappah has been the Director, UNESCO Mahatma Gandhi Institute of Education for Peace and Sustainable Development (MGIEP) since 2014. During his directorship the Institute has developed The International Science and Evidence based Education (ISEE) Assessment, LIBRE, theTalking across Generations on Education (TAGe) dialogue platform, the Knowledge Commons  platform and the online SixthSpace.

He is also responsible for developing the Empathy, Mindfulness, Compassion, Critical inquiry (EMC2) model which is an approach on Social and Emotional Learning (SEL). Dr Anantha has also developed UNESCO MGIEP's Artificial Intelligence powered General Data Protection Regulation (GDPR) compliant learning platform, FramerSpace, now being used across many countries by schools, educators and students.

Duraiappah is also currently:

 Visiting Professor, Urban Institute at the Kyushu University, Japan
Fellow and member, World Academy of Arts and Sciences
 Member of the Advisory Board, Journal - Indian Society of Ecological Economics.
 Co-Chair of The International Science and Evidence based Education (ISEE) Assessment

Previous positions

Published works

Bibliography 
 Duraiappah, A.K and others.  Ecology, Economy and Society: essays in honor of Kanchan Chopra. Springer, New Delhi, India. 2017.
 Duraiappah, A.K and others., The Inclusive Wealth Report 2014, IHDP-UNU and UNEP, Cambridge. University Press, 2014
 Duraiappah, A.K et.al., Satoyama-Satoumi Ecosystems and Human Well-being, United Nations University Press, Tokyo 2012
 Duraiappah and others, Millennium Ecosystem Assessment., Ecosystems and Human Well-being: Synthesis report of the Millennium Ecosystem Assessment, Island Press, 2005. 
 Duraiappah, A.K., Computational Models in the Economics of Environment and Development, Dordrecht, Holland: Springer, Environmental Series, 2003.
 Duraiappah, A.K., Global Warming and Economic Development: A Holistic Approach to International Policy Cooperation and Coordination, Dordrecht, Holland: Springer, 1993. (Translated into Japanese 1995)

Podcasts                            

 Peter Singer and Anantha Duraiappah, an interview by Mia Funk
 One Planet Podcast with The Creative Process
 The Art of Teaching Podcast with Matthew Green
 What Matters in EdTech: Future Tech and Trends with The EdTech Podcast

Articles

Keynotes and Talks

External links 
 Research publications on Research Gate and Google Scholar
 Mahatma Gandhi Institute of Education for Peace and Sustainable Development (MGIEP( 
LinkedIn
 Twitter

References 

Malaysian academics
UNESCO
Academic staff of the University of Tokyo
Year of birth missing (living people)
Living people
Academic staff of Vrije Universiteit Amsterdam
Academic staff of the National University of Singapore